Charla is an English feminine given name that is a feminine form of Charles. Notable people with the name include:

Given name
Charla Doherty (1946 – 1988), American film actress
Charla Baklayan Faddoul (born 1976), Armenian-American television actress
Charla King, murder victim
Charla Nash, assault victim of Travis (chimpanzee)
Charla Pihlstrom, winner of season 1 of Paradise Hotel
Charla Sedacca (born 1960), American female bodybuilder

Fictional characters
Charla Swann, main character of Island (novel series)

See also

Carla
Chakla (disambiguation)
Chala (disambiguation)
Challa (disambiguation)
Chara (given name)
Chara (surname)
Charka (disambiguation)
Charl (name)
Charle (name)
Charli (disambiguation)
Charlo (name)
Charls
Charly (name)
Charra (disambiguation)
Kharla Chávez
Sharla

Notes

English feminine given names